Air Vice Marshal Thomas Cathcart Traill,  (6 August 1899 – 1 October 1973) was a senior Royal Air Force officer. He began his military career as a midshipman in the Royal Navy, transferred to the Royal Flying Corps in 1917 and rose to the rank of captain during the First World War, becoming a flying ace credited with eight aerial victories. He remained in the newly formed Royal Air Force after the war; by the time he retired in 1954, he had risen to the rank of air vice marshal.

Early life
Thomas Cathcart Traill was born on 6 August 1899 in Argentina. He attended school at the Royal Naval Colleges at Osborne and Dartmouth.

First World War
Traill joined the Royal Navy as a midshipman on 2 August 1914, when he was just four days shy of his 15th birthday.

Traill transferred to the Royal Flying Corps to train as a pilot, and after completion of training was commissioned as a temporary second lieutenant on probation on 11 October 1917. He was assigned to No. 20 Squadron RFC that day as a Bristol F.2 Fighter pilot.

Traill was promoted to lieutenant on 1 April 1918, as the Royal Air Force came into existence. He was promoted to temporary captain when he was appointed as a flight commander on 28 September 1918.

Traill scored eight aerial victories. In the process, he had three other aces serve as his gunner/observer at various times. While in combat on 2 July 1918, Percy Griffith Jones called out a warning from the plane's rear seat and Traill ducked. The German fighter behind them killed Jones and put a bullet through the cockpit and out the windscreen, missing Traill. Traill's next observer took an incendiary bullet in his leg. Leslie William Burbidge then became Traill's observer.

On 23 October, while returning from the mission upon which Traill scored his eighth victory, Traill collided with another plane in his flight while flying at 7,000 feet. The accident knocked away part of the Bristol F.2 Fighter's wing. As the fighter tried to spin out of control, Burbidge leaped out onto the opposite wing at Traill's command, to counterbalance the spin while Traill struggled for control. The resultant crashlanding hurled Burbidge onto his face, but left Traill uninjured and preserved the airplane. Both men were awarded the Distinguished Flying Cross for this incident. Traill's citation read

List of aerial victories

Interwar period
Traill remained in military service, becoming the assistant air attaché in Washington D. C. in 1919. During this period he was sent off to join a barn-storming flying circus in the Mid West to raise funds for the Victory Liberty Loan. This was run by the United States Army Air Service under the command of Major George Stratemeyer. They travelled by train from Texas to the Canada–US border, putting on twenty-eight flying displays. These displays took place at race courses, sports grounds or fields. Large crowds attended as the local city authorities frequently closed all schools and colleges, and encouraged businesses to close in order to raise the maximum amount for the war loan. He returned home to Britain the following year, being assigned to experimental work beginning 18 May 1920. He entered the University of Cambridge on 1 October 1922, receiving a Master of Arts in 1924. After that, he had various further domestic military assignments, as well as foreign service in Iraq, before he began attendance at the RAF Staff College on 23 January 1933.

Traill was promoted to squadron leader on 1 December 1934. He was appointed to the command of No. 14 Squadron RAF on 16 August 1935, moving on to command RAF Helwan, Egypt on 10 May 1938. He was subsequently promoted to wing commander on 1 July 1938. On 26 September 1938, he was assigned to staff duty with the headquarters of No. 2 (Bomber) Group.

Second World War
On 14 May 1940, Traill was appointed assistant senior air staff officer at Headquarters Bomber Command. On 11 July 1940, he was made an Officer of the Order of the British Empire. A promotion to Group Captain followed on 1 December 1940. The following year would see him command RAF Middleton St. George before moving on to the post of senior air staff officer (SASO) at Headquarters, No. 242 Group. As part of 242 Group's deployment into Northwest African Air Forces, Traill was promoted to acting air commodore on 21 February 1943 and appointed SASO at the latter organization's headquarters on 8 March 1943. For his services there, he would be Mentioned in Despatches on 2 June 1943.

Traill was appointed director of air tactics on 28 February 1944, and selected as the RAF's liaison officer to the United States Army Air Forces' Eighth Air Force that same year. He was made of Officer of the American Legion of Merit on 11 April 1944, and was again Mentioned in Despatches on 8 June 1944.

Post-war career
On 1 September 1945, Traill became an acting air vice-marshal and was granted command of No. 83 Group RAF. He moved to command of No. 12 Group RAF on 5 May 1946. He was appointed an Officer of the Most Honourable Order of the Bath on 1 January 1948. One year later, he was confirmed as an air vice-marshal.

After a period as director-general of personnel that began on 25 April 1949, he was again appointed to command on 18 February 1952, this time as air officer commanding No. 19 (Reconnaissance) Group. By virtue of this appointment he also became air commander, North-East Atlantic Sub-Area, Allied Command Atlantic, NATO, in 1953.

Later life
Traill retired on 21 September 1954, having served for 40 years. He died on 1 October 1973, and was buried in Saint Margaret Churchyard, Heveningham, Suffolk, England.

References
Notes

Sources
 
 

1899 births
1973 deaths
Argentine aviators
Royal Navy officers of World War I
Royal Flying Corps officers
British World War I flying aces
Royal Air Force air marshals
Companions of the Order of the Bath
Officers of the Order of the British Empire
Recipients of the Distinguished Flying Cross (United Kingdom)
Recipients of the Legion of Merit
Argentina in World War I
Argentina in World War II